Torquigener altipinnis, the highfin toadfish, is a species of fish in the family Tetraodontidae. It is found in the coastal waters off eastern Australia, from southeast Queensland to Malabar, New South Wales, as well as Norfolk, Lord Howe and Raoul Islands.

References

External links
 Fishes of Australia : Torquigener altipinnis

altipinnis
Marine fish of Eastern Australia
highfin toadfish